Rainbow on the River (also known as It Happened in New Orleans) is a 1936 American musical film directed by Kurt Neumann from a screenplay by Harry Chandlee, Earle Snell, and William Hurlbut, based upon the novel Toinette's Philip by C. V. Jamison. Produced by Bobby Breen Productions and Principal Productions, the movie was premiered in New York City on December 17, 1936, and released nationwide by RKO Radio Pictures the following week on Christmas Day. The film stars Bobby Breen, May Robson and Charles Butterworth.

Plot summary
An orphan raised by a former slave in the South is forced to live with unfamiliar relatives in the North.

Cast 
 Bobby Breen as Philip Ainsworth
 May Robson as Mrs. Harriet Ainsworth
 Charles Butterworth as Barrett
 Alan Mowbray as Ralph Layton
 Benita Hume as Julia Layton
 Henry O'Neill as Father Josef
 Louise Beavers as Toinette
 Marilyn Knowlden as Lucille Layton
 Lillian Yarbo as Seline (uncredited)

External links

References

1936 films
1936 musical films
American musical films
Films directed by Kurt Neumann
American black-and-white films
Films produced by Sol Lesser
1930s American films
1930s English-language films